Charlotte Helen Watts,  (born 1962) is a British mathematician, epidemiologist, and academic. Since 2006, she has been Professor of Social and Mathematical Epidemiology at the London School of Hygiene and Tropical Medicine. She was also the Chief Scientific Advisor to the UK's Department for International Development from 2015 to 2020. Her research interests include HIV and gender-based violence.

Early life and education
Born in Farnborough, Kent, England in 1962, she was educated at Falmouth School, a state school in Cornwall. She studied mathematics and pure mathematics at university. She graduated from Exeter College, Oxford with a Bachelor of Arts (BA) degree in 1984, and from Marlboro College (in Vermont, US) with a Master of Science (MSc) degree in 1986. She then attended the University of Warwick, graduating with a Doctor of Philosophy (PhD) degree in mathematics in 1990: her doctoral thesis concerned the "stochastic stability of diffeomorphisms".

Career
Watts was a Royal Society Postdoctoral Research Fellow at the University of Oxford from 1991 to 1993. She then moved to the London School of Hygiene and Tropical Medicine (LSHTM) as a lecturer in 1994. She was a lecturer at the University of Zimbabwe from  1994 to 1997, before returning to LSHTM. She has been Professor of Social and Mathematical Epidemiology at the London School of Hygiene and Tropical Medicine (LSHTM) since 2006. She was Chief Scientific Advisor to the Department for International Development from 2015 to 2020.

Watts founded the Gender Violence Research Centre at the London School of Hygiene and Tropical Medicine. This team collaborated in 2012 with Liz Kelly and colleagues at the Child and Woman Abuse Studies Unit, London Metropolitan University and Nicole Westmarland and her research team at Durham University's Crime, Violence and Abuse group to assess the impact of community domestic violence perpetrator programmes on women and children's safety, as well as investigating related questions such as which specific factors enable violent men to change their behaviour. The research was supported by Respect, the UK's umbrella organisation for domestic violence perpetrator programmes.

Watts has done field work on gender based violence at the Musasa Project in Zimbabwe. The project is a women's NGO working to address the widespread violence against women in Zimbabwe.

Other activities
 Coalition for Epidemic Preparedness Innovations (CEPI), Member of the Board
 UK Collaborative on Development Research (UKCDR), Member of the Strategic Coherence of ODA-funded Research

Honours
In 2015, Watts was elected a Fellow of the Academy of Medical Sciences (FMedSci). In the 2019 Queen's Birthday Honours, she was appointed a Companion of the Order of St Michael and St George (CMG) "for services to global health and international development".

Personal life
Watts is married and has two sons.

Selected works

References

1962 births
British mathematicians
British women mathematicians
British women epidemiologists
Academics of the University of Oxford
Academics of the London School of Hygiene & Tropical Medicine
Academic staff of the University of Zimbabwe
Fellows of the Academy of Medical Sciences (United Kingdom)
Companions of the Order of St Michael and St George
People from Farnborough, London
Alumni of Exeter College, Oxford
Marlboro College alumni
Alumni of the University of Warwick
Living people